This article presents the discography of British progressive rock band Asia.

Albums

Studio albums

Live albums

Compilation albums

EPs

Singles

Notes:
 A^ - Single released in Japan.
 C^ - released in UK/Europe.
 D^ - released in Europe.

Music videos

References

External links
 

Discography
Discographies of British artists
Rock music group discographies